Erin Young Toughill  (born June 13, 1977) is an American professional boxer and former mixed martial artist who also appeared as a Gladiator on the American Gladiators series.

She began kickboxing at the age of 18 and started training in Brazilian Jiu-Jitsu soon after.

Under the watch of her LA Boxing trainer Sean McCully, Toughill debuted in mixed martial arts on September 27, 1999 and fought to a draw with Irma Verhoeff at World Vale Tudo Championship 9 in Aruba.

Less than a year later, she made her professional boxing debut on July 20, 2000.

Along with her MMA career, Toughill holds a professional boxing record of 7 wins, 5 losses, 1 draw and 1 no contest.

She counts IBF Super Middleweight contender Librado Andrade, a long-time sparring partner, among her close friends.

Boxing career
Toughill has only one loss before losing her battle against Laila Ali. Her final boxing match was against Laura Ramsey, whom she defeated previously. Toughill's father died three days before her rematch to Laura Ramsey.  Toughill lost the fight by TKO in the first round and retired soon after with a record of 7-3-1, 1 NC.

Toughill returned to boxing on January 27, 2019 against Maricela Cornejo losing a unanimous division. Toughill fought again on May 18, 2019 losing via TKO to Raquel Miller.

Mixed martial arts career
After going 1-1-1 in her first three bouts, Toughill won five straight fights before losing in the finals of the 2004 Smackgirl World ReMix Tournament to Megumi Yabushita. She competed once more and scored a TKO victory over  Jen Case in 2006.

In 2007, Toughill retired from both boxing and MMA. Toughill came out of retirement from MMA and fought Jan Finney on November 20, 2008 at Palace Fighting Championships 11.

Strikeforce
Toughill was set to make her Strikeforce debut on November 7, 2009 at Strikeforce: Fedor vs. Rogers in a rematch with Marloes Coenen, whom Toughill defeated in 2004. However, she later withdrew from the fight due to an undisclosed medical condition.

On March 18, 2010, Toughill announced that she was planning to leave Strikeforce. She had been scheduled to compete on the undercard of Strikeforce: Nashville on April 17. However, in a second posting on April 9, 2010, Toughill attributed the disagreements with Strikeforce to misunderstandings and stated that she would be staying with the promotion.

Toughill was scheduled to face Shana Olsen at Strikeforce: Houston on August 21, 2010, but the fight was cancelled due to concerns over Toughill's ability to make weight. According to Strikeforce CEO Scott Coker, Toughill's next fight will not take place in Strikeforce, but she remains a part of the promotion's roster.

Toughill was offered to face Cristiane Santos for a bout in 2010, but the fight never came into fruition.

Post Strikeforce
Toughill was scheduled to compete outside of Strikeforce against China's Bao Yu Dan at Martial Combat 9 on September 15, 2010 in Singapore. However, on September 13, Toughill withdrew from the fight after citing a broken clavicle.

Toughill returned to active competition after nearly two years at Freestyle Cage Fighting 46 on April 9, 2011.  The fight was against Ashley Sanchez at a  catchweight (per Toughill's request). Toughill lost the fight via unanimous decision.

Toughill agreed to face Anna Barone at BlackEye Promotions 5 on October 1, 2011 in Fletcher, North Carolina, but withdrew from the fight after suffering a rib injury in training.

American Gladiators
Toughill became a cast member of NBC's primetime series, American Gladiators, where she became known as Steel. One of the commentators on American Gladiators, Laila Ali, knocked her out.

Bare Knuckle Boxing 
Toughill made her bare knuckle boxing debut with BYB Extreme Bare Knuckle Fighting Series, losing a 5-round split decision to Jozette Cotton at the Seminole Hard Rock Hotel and Casino, Hollywood on July 16, 2021.  On March 12, 2022, she defeated Sonya Dreiling via unanimous decision improving her bare knuckle record to 1-1.

Personal life
Erin married Neil Melanson, a grappling coach and lead Jiu-Jitsu instructor at Xtreme Couture, in a private ceremony on November 20, 2009. Melanson also serves as the primary grappling coach for UFC Hall of Famer Randy Couture, and has cornered Couture during several recent MMA fights. The couple is currently going through a divorce.

Toughill's younger sister, Megan, was killed in a car accident on September 19, 2004, which was about three weeks before her title fight with Yvonne Reis.

Media
Toughill was featured on MSNBC's Warrior Nation as she prepared for a fight.

In 2022, Toughill launched Talk Tough with Erin Toughill, an interview-style podcast focused on bare knuckle boxing.

Mixed martial arts record

|-
| Loss
| align=center| 10-3-1
| Ashley Sanchez
| Decision (unanimous)
| Freestyle Cage Fighting 46
| 
| align=center| 3
| align=center| 5:00
| Shawnee, Oklahoma, United States
| 
|-
| Win
| align=center| 10-2-1
| Emily Thompson
| Decision (unanimous)
| PFC 13: Validation
| 
| align=center| 3
| align=center| 3:00
| Lemoore, California, United States
| 
|-
| Win
| align=center| 9-2-1
| Karen Williams
| TKO (punches)
| PFC: Best of Both Worlds
| 
| align=center| 1
| align=center| 2:06
| Lemoore, California, United States
| 
|-
| Win
| align=center| 8-2-1
| Jan Finney
| Decision (unanimous)
| PFC 11: All In
| 
| align=center| 3
| align=center| 3:00
| Lemoore, California, United States
| 
|-
| Win
| align=center| 7-2-1
| Jen Case
| TKO (punches)
| VF - Showdown at Cache Creek II
| 
| align=center| 2
| align=center| 2:22
| Brooks, California, United States
| 
|-
| Loss
| align=center| 6-2-1
| Megumi Yabushita
| DQ (elbows)
| Smackgirl - World ReMix 2004
| 
| align=center| 1
| align=center| 2:39
| Shizuoka, Japan
|  Open Weight Queen tournament finals.
|-
| Win
| align=center| 6-1-1
| Marloes Coenen
| KO (punch)
| Smackgirl - World ReMix 2004
| 
| align=center| 1
| align=center| 5:00
| Shizuoka, Japan
|  Open Weight Queen tournament semi-finals.
|-
| Win
| align=center| 5-1-1
| Miwako Ishihara
| TKO (corner stoppage)
| Smackgirl - World ReMix 2004
| 
| align=center| 1
| align=center| 0:27
| Shizuoka, Japan
|  Open Weight Queen tournament first round.
|-
| Win
| align=center| 4-1-1
| Miwako Ishihara
| Decision (unanimous)
| Smackgirl - Dynamic
| 
| align=center| 3
| align=center| 5:00
| Shizuoka, Japan
| 
|-
| Win
| align=center| 3-1-1
| Kaoru Ito
| Decision (unanimous)
| W - Fusion
| 
| align=center| 3
| align=center| 5:00
| Tokyo, Japan
| 
|-
| Win
| align=center| 2-1-1
| Megumi Yabushita
| Technical Submission (armbar)
| ReMix - Golden Gate 2001
| 
| align=center| 2
| align=center| 3:08
| Japan
| 
|-
| Loss
| align=center| 1-1-1
| Svetlana Goundarenko
| Submission (scarf-hold armlock)
| ReMix - World Cup 2000
| 
| align=center| 1
| align=center| 2:47
| Japan
| Open Weight tournament semi-finals.
|-
| Win
| align=center| 1-0-1
| Irina Rodina
| Decision (split)
| ReMix - World Cup 2000
| 
| align=center| 2
| align=center| 5:00
| Japan
| Open Weight tournament quarter-finals.
|-
| Draw
| align=center| 0-0-1
| Irma Verhoeff
| Draw
| World Vale Tudo Championship 9
| 
| align=center| 1
| align=center| 15:00
| Aruba
|

Professional boxing record

Bare knuckle boxing record

Accomplishments
 Brown Belt in Brazilian Jiu-Jitsu under James Boran
 2001 ReMix Golden Gate Japan Champion
 W-Fusion 2001 Japan Champion

References

External links
 
 
 Fightergirls.com profile
 Official American Gladiators Bio

1977 births
Living people
Sportspeople from Chicago
American women boxers
Boxers from Chicago
American female mixed martial artists
Mixed martial artists utilizing boxing
Mixed martial artists utilizing Brazilian jiu-jitsu
American practitioners of Brazilian jiu-jitsu
Female Brazilian jiu-jitsu practitioners
21st-century American women